KNZS (100.3 FM) is a radio station airing a Classic rock format licensed to Arlington, Kansas.  The station serves the Hutchinson, Kansas area, and is owned by Ad Astra Per Aspera Broadcasting, Inc.

References

External links
KNZS's official website

Classic rock radio stations in the United States
NZS